A knighting sword is a sword used by a monarch during an investiture ceremony in which a person is given an accolade and becomes a knight.  

The knighting sword used by the British monarch Queen Elizabeth II is the sword she inherited from her father, George VI, from when he was Duke of York and colonel of the Scots Guard.

References

 Knights
Swords